Cerithiopsilla gaussiana is a species of  very small sea snails, marine gastropod molluscs in the family Cerithiopsidae. It was described by Egorova in 1972.

References

Cerithiopsidae
Gastropods described in 1972